William or Bill Smeaton may refer to: 
 William Henry Oliphant Smeaton, Scottish writer
 William Arthur Smeaton, British chemist and historian of science
 Bill Smeaton (politician), mayor of Niagara Falls, Ontario
 Bill Smeaton (footballer), Australian rules footballer